Clare Carey (born June 11, 1967) is an American film and television actress best known for her roles as Kelly Fox in Coach (1989-1995) and Mary Bailey in Jericho (2006-2008), and her film role in Savannah Sunrise (2016).

Background

Carey was born at a Catholic mission in Rhodesia where her father (a doctor) and mother (a teacher) were serving. She lives in Los Angeles with her husband and two children.

Career

Though having acted in many films, Carey is best known for her recurring roles in episodic television, most notably for her role as Kelly Fox on the American sitcom Coach and her role as Macy Carlson, the Olsen twins' mother on the ABC Family sitcom So Little Time. She has also had recurring roles on Point Pleasant in the role of Sarah Parker, Jericho as bartender Mary Bailey, Crash as Christine Emory and made a guest-star appearance in Eli Stone as a lawyer opposing Eli in court. Carey also did a cameo in the indie film La Cucina, which premiered on Showtime in December 2009. She plays Rachel Hunter's girlfriend.

She also played a part in NCIS episode "Life Before His Eyes" as Ann Gibbs, the mother of Leroy Jethro Gibbs, played by Mark Harmon. Carey later appeared on NCIS' spinoff NCIS: New Orleans, playing militia villainess Anne Boudreau in the episode, "Sic Semper Tyrannis."

Filmography

Film

Television

Theatre

References

External links
  
https://web.archive.org/web/20091015141033/http://www.starz.com/originals/crash/
https://web.archive.org/web/20090212030340/http://www.superu.ca/content/490
http://www.clarecarey.net 

1967 births
Living people
20th-century American actresses
21st-century American actresses
American film actresses
American stage actresses
American television actresses
Rhodesian emigrants to the United States